East Azerbaijan's codes are 15, 25 and 35. In public cars, Taxis and Governal cars the letter is always the same. But in simple cars this letter (ب) depends on the city.

15
15 is Tabriz county's code and all of the letters are for Tabriz.

25

35

Road transport in Iran
Transportation in East Azerbaijan Province